The Monégasque Football Federation (FMF) is the governing body of football in the nation of Monaco. The association is not a member of FIFA or UEFA, but it does have membership to the NF-Board and its successor CONIFA.

The FMF runs the national football team and the three domestic cup tournaments played in the principality.

Organization
The Monégasque Football Federation was founded in 2000 and accepted by the country's government on 27 April. There is a small board of six people of Monégasque descent who are elected for four year terms to run the organisation. They aim to allow their members to play football together and organize friendlies.

Tournaments

As well as administering the national team, the Monegasque Football Federation also organises three domestic cup competitions in the principality:
Challenge Prince Rainier III - the most prestigious cup in Monaco.
Trophée Ville de Monaco - the second level competition in the country.
Challenge Monégasque - the third most important competition in Monaco.

See also
Football in Monaco
Monaco national football team
Challenge Prince Rainier III
Trophée Ville de Monaco
Challenge Monégasque
List of football clubs in Monaco

References

Football in Monaco